Terrors is an EP released by D'espairsRay on July 21, 2001. Due to quick sales within a small amount of time, a second pressing was released a year later, along with their EP Sexual Beast. While the first pressing came in a regular jewel case, the reissue had a special sleevecase with new artwork.

Track listing

The song "Erode" is spelled as "ero:de" on the album.
The song "Murder Freaks" is misspelled as "muder freaks" on the back of the album and would later be re-recorded for the Born EP. The interlude at the beginning of the song was placed at the end of the song "Marry of the Blood" in that version.

2001 EPs
D'espairsRay EPs